Patric Gozzi (born May 6, 1991) is a Swedish professional ice hockey player, currently playing with Almtuna IS in the HockeyAllsvenskan. He played with AIK IF in the Elitserien during the 2010–11 Elitserien season.

He is the son of Anders Gozzi and brother to Christoffer Gozzi.

References

External links

1991 births
Almtuna IS players
AIK IF players
Living people
Swedish ice hockey centres
Ice hockey people from Stockholm